This is a list of parliaments of the United Kingdom, tabulated with the elections to the House of Commons and the list of members of the House.

The parliaments are numbered from the formation of the United Kingdom of Great Britain and Ireland. For previous Westminster parliaments, see the list of parliaments of Great Britain and list of parliaments of England. For pre-Union Dublin parliaments, see the list of parliaments of Ireland. For pre-1707 Scottish parliaments, see the list of parliaments of Scotland.

List of parliaments

The parties listed are those that won the election. During the nineteenth century, the party of government sometimes changed between general elections.

Notes
 The term Prime Minister was not officially recognised until Campbell-Bannerman, although the title had been in common use, if initially as an insult, since 1721.

See also
Duration of English parliaments before 1660
Duration of English, British and United Kingdom parliaments from 1660
List of parliaments of England
List of parliaments of Scotland
List of parliaments of Great Britain
List of British governments

Political history of the United Kingdom
 
United Kingdom Parliaments
United Kingdom Parliaments